Two Japanese warships have borne the name Ushio:

 , a  launched in 1905 and scrapped in 1928
 , a  launched in 1930 and scrapped in 1948

Imperial Japanese Navy ship names
Japanese Navy ship names